Cavendish Road State High School is a co-educational, state secondary school, located at 695 Cavendish Road, Holland Park, Brisbane, Queensland, Australia. Established in 1952, Cavendish Road State High School was the second state high school to be built in the suburbs of Brisbane. The school is a short distance from the Brisbane CBD.

The school motto, Nil sine pulvere, nil praeter optima, translates from Latin as "Nothing without effort, nothing but the best". As part of these "Excellence Programs" the school has developed partnerships with the University of Queensland, Griffith University and the Queensland University of Technology, which allow eligible students to exit Year 12 with credit, fee free, towards a university degree. A number of relationships with various sporting associations and private businesses (for apprenticeships/traineeships) in Queensland have also been developed.

Notable alumni
 Ian Henderson (Australian politician)
 Loretta Harrop, gold and silver winning olympic triathlete
 Dick Johnson (racing driver), five-time Australian Touring Car Championship, three-time winner of the Bathurst 1000 and was inducted into the V8 Supercars Hall of Fame in 2001
 Tahj Minniecon, soccer player for the Loyola Meralco Sparks F.C.
 Stephen Page, Artistic director of the Bangarra Dance Theatre and choreographer of various routines for the ceremonies of the 1996 Atlanta Olympic Games and 2000 Sydney Olympic Games
 Dario Vidošić, soccer player for the Melbourne City FC and as an attacking midfielder for the Australia national football team
 Jesse Williams (American football), defensive tackle and first Australian to win a Super Bowl Ring with the Seattle Seahawks in 2013.
 Katrina Gorry - soccer player
 Luke Brattan - soccer player
 Jennifer Boyce - base player for Ball Park Music

See also
Education in Australia
List of schools in Queensland

References

External links
Cavendish Road State High Homepage

Public high schools in Brisbane
Educational institutions established in 1952
1952 establishments in Australia